The V Conference of Heads of State and Government of the CPLP, commonly known as the 5th CPLP Summit (V Cimeira da CPLP) was the 5th biennial meeting of heads of state and heads of government of the Community of Portuguese Language Countries, held in Brasília, Brazil, on 26-27 July 2004.

Outcome
Equatorial Guinea began the formal proceedings in becoming a full member of the CPLP during this summit.

Executive Secretary
Cabo Verdian diplomat Luís de Matos Monteiro da Fonseca was elected as the Executive Secretary of the Community of Portuguese Language Countries, succeeding Brazilian diplomat João Augusto de Médicis in the position.

References

External links
CPLP Summits official site

CPLP Summits